Joseph ibn Migash or Joseph ben Meir HaLevi ibn Migash or Yosef Ibn Meir Ha-Levi Ibn Megas  or José ben Meir ibn Megas  (early 1077 – c. 1141) was a Rabbi, Posek, and Rosh Yeshiva in Lucena (actually Spain). He is also known as Ri Migash, the Hebrew acronym for "Rabbi Joseph Migash".

Biography
Joseph ibn Migash was probably born in Seville (though Steinschneider believes it was Granada). He moved to Lucena at the age of 12 to study under the renowned Talmudist Isaac Alfasi. He studied under Alfasi at Lucena for fourteen years. Shortly before his death (1103), Alfasi ordained Ibn Migash as a rabbi, and - passing over his own son - also appointed him, then 26, to be his successor as Rosh Yeshiva (seminary head). Joseph ibn Migash held this position for 38 years. 

Rabbi Abraham ben David, in his work Sefer ha-Kabbalah (Book of Tradition), mentions Joseph ibn Migash, a grandfather who had the same name, as being a contemporary of Samuel haNagid, and that during the dispute between the supporters of Bulukkin and the supporters of Badis, the Berber ruler of Granada, Joseph ibn Migash had sided with Bulukkin in this dispute and fled to Askilia, to avoid punishment. 

It is clear that Migash was a great scholar: Maimonides in the introduction to his Mishnah commentary says "the Talmudic learning of this man amazes every one who understands his words and the depth of his speculative spirit; so that it might almost be said of him that his equal has never existed." Judah ha-Levi eulogizes him in six poems which are full of his praise. Joseph ibn Migash's best known student is probably Maimon, the father and teacher of Maimonides. In Maimonides' Introduction to his Mishnah commentary, he heaps lavish praises upon Rabbi Joseph ibn Migash (Halevi), saying of him: “I have collected what I stumbled across from the glosses of my father, of blessed memory, as well as others under the name of our Rabbi Joseph Halevi, of blessed memory; and as the Lord lives, the understanding of that man in the Talmud is astounding, as anyone [can see] who observes his words and the depth of his comprehension, until I can say of him that 'there has never been any king like unto him before him''' (cf. 2 Kings 23:25) in his method [of elucidation]. I have also collected all of the legal matters (Heb. halachot) that I found that belonged to him in his commentaries, themselves.”There is a tradition that Maimonides himself was a pupil of Joseph ibn Migash.  This probably arose from the frequent references in Maimonides' works to him as an authority.  It is unlikely that he was literally taught by him, as Maimonides was 3 years old at the time of Joseph ibn Migash's death.

However, Maimonides' grandson published a pamphlet with the approval of his grandfather, in which it is described that Maimonides ran away from home in his youth, met Joseph ibn Migash, and studied under him for several years.

Works
Joseph ibn Migash authored over 200 responsa, She'elot u-Teshuvot Ri Migash - originally in Judeo-Arabic - many of which are quoted in Bezalel Ashkenazi's Shittah Mekubetzet. Five of Ibn Migash's responsa survived in Yemen, and were published by Rabbi Yosef Qafih in 1973. He specified Chananel Ben Chushiel and Alfasi as his authorities, but disagreed with Alfasi in about thirty some odd places related to Halacha. 

He also authored a Talmudic commentary -  ḥiddushim (novellae) on tractates Baba Batra (link here) and Shevuot (included in Joseph Samuel Modiano's Uryan Telitai'', Salonica 1795) -  which is quoted by various Rishonim. His other works have been lost.

References

External links
 Ibn Migas, Joseph (Jehosef) Ben Meïr Ha-Levi, jewishencyclopedia.com
 Uryan Telitai

1077 births
1141 deaths
12th-century rabbis in al-Andalus
People from Seville
Rosh yeshivas
Authors of books on Jewish law
11th-century Jews from al-Andalus